Michel Verin (1468–1487) was a 15th-century Florentine poet.

Early life
Verin was born in 1468 in Florence to a father by the name of Hugolino. His father instructed him in philosophy and language from an early age before sending him to a seminary at the age of ten. There he learned multiple languages and studied history as well as philosophy. Verin was widely considered to have good character with several folk tales be written about it.

Career
Verin's first publication was in 1481 at the age of 13. It was published under the title Moral Distichs which was a collection of Latin maxims reduced into a poetic form. This work was well received by critics of the time. The next year he published a book of Proverbs in verse.

Death and legacy
Verin died in 1487 and is considered to have influenced the works of people including Claude Hardy and Ritchlet.

References

15th-century Italian poets
Italian poets
1468 births
1487 deaths